Comedown Machine is the fifth studio album by American rock band the Strokes. It was released on March 26, 2013, through RCA Records. The band decided to pull a media blackout for the album, with no promotion in the form of television appearances, interviews, photoshoots, live shows, or tours. The cover artwork was designed to resemble an old RCA tape reel box.

Comedown Machine received mostly positive reviews from critics, and was placed at number 41 on the NMEs list of the "50 Best Albums of 2013".

Promotion and release 
Before the release of the album the song "One Way Trigger" was released as a free download and was made available for streaming via YouTube and SoundCloud, and as a free download via the band's official website on January 25, 2013. Julian Casablancas posted a stylized lyric sheet for the song, designed by long-time collaborator Warren Fu, on his official website on January 30, 2013. "All the Time" was released as a digital download on February 19, 2013 and later released as a 7-inch single on April 20, 2013 and contained "Fast Animals" as the B-side.

Reception

Critical
Media response to Comedown Machine was generally favorable; the aggregating website Metacritic reports a weighted average rating of 68%, based on 44 reviews. "Whether you're in an Is This It vortex or not, this is The Strokes and they've returned with their most thought-provoking, strange and sexiest record yet," said Kieran Mayall of Clash magazine. James Skinner of BBC Music added, "Although plenty of the group’s signature sounds are present and correct, they form the backdrop to an unexpectedly wide range of styles and approaches." In contrast, Rob Sheffield of Rolling Stone questioned why the album was "an official Strokes album instead of another Casablancas solo album."

Commercial
Without much promotional effort, Comedown Machine entered the UK Albums Chart at No. 10 but became the band's first album not to debut within the top three. The album did, however, give the band their fifth consecutive appearance in the top ten. Likewise, it reached No.10 in the US with an entry sales week of 41,000 copies, the band's weakest performance since Is This It in 2001.

Track listing

Personnel

The Strokes
Julian Casablancas – vocals
Albert Hammond Jr. – guitar, keyboards
Nick Valensi – guitar, keyboards, Mellotron on "80's Comedown Machine"
Nikolai Fraiture – bass guitar, double bass on "Call It Fate, Call It Karma"
Fabrizio Moretti – drums, percussion

Production
Gus Oberg – producer, audio mixer, engineer
Phil Joly – engineer
 Dave Lutch – mastering

Design
Brett Kilroe – art direction, design
Fab Moretti – art direction
Tina Ibañez – design
Colin Lane – original band photography
Jason McDonald – still life photography

Charts

References

2013 albums
The Strokes albums
RCA Records albums
Albums recorded at Electric Lady Studios